Pristimantis ixalus is a species of frog in the family Strabomantidae. It is endemic to Colombia where it is known from its type locality in the northern Cordillera Oriental (Betulia in the Santander Department). Its natural habitat are streams in very humid forest.
It is potentially threatened by habitat loss.

References

ixalus
Endemic fauna of Colombia
Amphibians of Colombia
Frogs of South America
Amphibians described in 2003
Taxonomy articles created by Polbot